Tetsuya Fujii (Fujii Tetsuya; born 1960) is a Japanese amateur astronomer and prolific discoverer of minor planets.

From 1988 to 1992, he had discovered a total of 22 numbered asteroids together with his colleague, Kazuro Watanabe, at the Kitami Observatory in the Kitami-Abashiri Region Cultural Centre in eastern Hokkaidō, Japan, where several amateur astronomers have been conducting an active program of astrometric observations of minor planets and comets. He is director of the astronomical club in Kitami, where he also works for the NHK broadcasting office.

The minor planet 4343 Tetsuya, discovered by Seiji Ueda and Hiroshi Kaneda in 1988, was named in his honour.

See also 
 5357 Sekiguchi, an outer main-belt asteroid
 5474 Gingasen, a Baptistina asteroid

References 
 

1960 births
Discoverers of asteroids

20th-century Japanese astronomers
Living people
21st-century Japanese astronomers